Babusinh Sarabhai Jadav is an Indian politician and a member of the Gujarat Legislative Assembly.  He was elected to represent the Dholka Assembly constituency in the 2022 and is a member of the Bharatiya Janata Party (BJP). Prior to his career in politics. Jadav worked as a farmer and has been actively involved in the agriculture sector in Gujarat.

In the Gujarat Legislative Assembly, Jadav has focused on issues related to agriculture and rural development, and claims to have worked to improve the lives of farmers and rural communities in his constituency.

Early life 
Babusinh Jadav was born in Limbdi, Gujarat.

Jadav received his education at the Maharaja Sayajirao University in Vadodara, Gujarat.

References 

Members of the Gujarat Legislative Assembly
Year of birth missing (living people)
Living people
Maharaja Sayajirao University of Baroda alumni
Bharatiya Janata Party politicians from Gujarat